Naayattu is a 1980 Indian Malayalam-language action film written and directed by Sreekumaran Thampi and produced by Hemnag Productions. It is a remake of the 1973 Hindi film Zanjeer. The film stars Jayan in the lead role with Prem Nazir, Sukumari and Adoor Bhasi in supporting roles. The music was composed by Shyam, while cinematography was handled by C. Ramachandra Menon. The film revolves around a tough and honest police officer who clashes with a crime boss who, unbeknownst to him, happens to be his parents' murderer.

This was Jayan's 100th film. This film was a major commercial success and was one of the highest grossing films of 1980. The film completed a 50 day run. This is the only film in which Prem Nazir played a supporting role at his superstardom under Jayan in the lead. In other films Prem Nazir and Jayan are co-actors.

Cast 
Jayan as Kerala Police Sub Inspector Vijayan
Prem Nazir as Rowdy Abdulla
Sukumari
Adoor Bhasi as Joseph
 Meena as Janaki
Zarina Wahab
Jayamalini
KPAC Sunny
N. Govindankutty
 Lalu Alex as Peter
 K. P. A. C. Azeez
 Poojappura Ravi
 T.R Radhakrishnan
 Philomina
 Lissi
 Sumagali
 Pushpa
Vallathol Unnikrishnan as Prabhakaran

Soundtrack 
The music was composed by Shyam and the lyrics were written by Sreekumaran Thampi.

Box office 
The film was commercial success.

References

External links 

1980 films
1980s Malayalam-language films
Films directed by Sreekumaran Thampi
Malayalam remakes of Hindi films
Fictional portrayals of the Kerala Police